Baudisch is a surname. Notable people with the surname include:

 Gudrun Baudisch-Wittke (1907–1982), Austrian woman ceramist, sculptor, and painter
 Oskar Baudisch (1881–1950), Austrian American biochemist and radiographer
 Patrick Baudisch, German computer scientist
 Reinold Baudisch (1951-2011), German Brazilian entrepreneur, writer, director and television fishing show presenter 
 Renata Baudisch, Brazilian entrepreneur 
 Alfred Reinold Baudisch, Brazilian computer scientist

German-language surnames